The Batignolles-Chatillon Char 25T is a light early cold war medium tank, developed in the 1950s by the Batignolles-Chatillon company in France.

Development 
It was designed for a 25-ton weight class, which is nearly twice the weight of the AMX-13. Its primary armament  was a 90 mm cannon, and was operated by 4 crew members. Its speed could reach 65 km/h. Two prototypes were made before it was set aside. However, some principles of creation of the tank and some of its technology were used in other French AFVs. Some variants were developed, but none of these were ever used in active service with the French Army.

Design 
The Char 25T was designed around the gun and mobility so therefore little to no importance was put on the armor. The 90 mm gun shared the same ammunition as the T119 gun used in the American M47 Patton (later designated 90 mm M36). The tank was supposed to get up to 65km/h on the road with a 40km/h cruising speed. The gun was fed by an automatic loader. The total amount of ammunition that was stored inside the tank totaled to 52 shells 16 of which were found in the turret. The turret was of the oscillating type and consisted of two pieces. The bottom part functioned as the base of the turret, which also contained the turret ring which moved the turret horizontally, while the top part (containing the cannon) was joined by a hinge and was capable of moving up and down to elevations of -6˚/+13˚. In terms of armor, the Char 25T was extremely lacking, with the thickest point being 50mm. This armor could only protect against heavy machine guns but that was enough considering the role of the tank being focused on a hit-and-run tactic. The tank was also equipped with 2 7.5mm machine guns for close range anti infantry fire and/or estimating the range until to the enemy target. The tank also had four smoke grenade launchers (two on each side) so it could deploy them for extra shielding while it ran away from a difficult situation. As the tank lacked any thermal imagery devices aiming was hard and time consuming. That is why the tank was equipped with a total of 16 periscopes and one fixed binocular. The tank commander was also fitted with a priority device using which he could take control of the cannon from the gunner in case he needed to shoot urgently and the gunner wasn't ready.

Surviving examples 
There were at least 2 prototypes of the Char 25T of which one is at the Musée des Blindés in Saumur, France. The fate of the other prototype is yet unknown.

See also
AMX-13
AMX-30
AMX ELC
AMX-10P

References
Note

References

External links
 Chars-francais.net

Tanks of France
Medium tanks of the Cold War